Pronsky (masculine), Pronskaya (feminine), or Pronskoye (neuter) is the name of several rural localities in Russia:
Pronskoye, Kursk Oblast, a village in Brezhnevsky Selsoviet of Kursky District of Kursk Oblast
Pronskoye, Moscow Oblast, a village in Nikolskoye Rural Settlement of Odintsovsky District of Moscow Oblast